The Ho Chi Minh Young Pioneer Organization is a communist youth organization operating in Vietnam named after former Vietnamese president Ho Chi Minh. It operates as a constituent part of the Communist Party of Vietnam and had approximately 12 million members .

History
The Ho Chi Minh Young Pioneer Organization was founded by the Communist Party of Vietnam on 15 May 1941 in Na Ma, Truong Ha commune, Hà Quảng District, Cao Bằng Province. The organization is instructed and guided by the Ho Chi Minh Communist Youth Union. It is required to have prior membership in the Communist Youth Organization to join the Communist Party of Vietnam, and being a Young Pioneer is a prerequisite to joining the Youth Organization.

Its motto is: Vì tổ quốc xã hội chủ nghĩa, vì lý tưởng của Bác Hồ vĩ đại: Sẵn sàng!.

See also
Scouting and Guiding in Vietnam

References

External links
  

 
Education in Vietnam
Educational organizations based in Vietnam
Pioneer movement